Sankt Ilgen was a municipality in the district of Bruck-Mürzzuschlag in Styria, Austria.

As of 1 January 2015 it has been incorporated into Thörl.

References

Cities and towns in Bruck-Mürzzuschlag District